Calumma boettgeri is a species of chameleon, a lizard in the family Chamaeleonidae. The species is endemic to Madagascar.

Etymology
The specific name, boettgeri, is in honor of German herpetologist Oskar Boettger.

Geographic range
C. boettgeri is found in northern Madagascar, including the island of Nosy Be.

Habitat

Description

Behavior

Reproduction
C. boettgeri is oviparous.

References

Further reading
Barbour T (1903). "Two New Species of Chamaeleon". Proceedings of the Biological Society of Washington 16: 61–62. ("Chamaeleo macrorhinus ", new species, p. 62).
Boulenger GA (1888). "Descriptions of two new Chamæleons from Nossi Bé, Madagascar ". Annals and Magazine of Natural History, Sixth Series 1: 22–23. ("Chamæleon Bœttgeri ", new species, p. 23 + Plate II, figure 3).
Prötzel D, Ruthensteiner B, Scherz MD, Glaw F (2015). "Systematic revision of the Malagasy chameleons Calumma boettgeri and C. linotum (Squamata: Chamaeleonidae)". Zootaxa 4048 (2): 211–231.

Calumma
Reptiles of Madagascar
Reptiles described in 1888
Taxa named by George Albert Boulenger